Tapirira guianensis is a species of plant in the family Anacardiaceae. It is native to Cerrado and Atlantic Forest (ecoregions) vegetation in Brazil.

References

guianensis
Endemic flora of Brazil
Flora of the Atlantic Forest
Flora of the Cerrado
Trees of Brazil
Trees of Ecuador
Trees of Peru